The 1952 Atlantic hurricane season was the last Atlantic hurricane season in which tropical cyclones were named using the Joint Army/Navy Phonetic Alphabet. It was a near normal Atlantic hurricane season, although it was the least active since 1946. The season officially started on June 15; however, a pre-season unnamed storm formed on Groundhog Day, becoming the only storm on record in the month of February. The other six tropical cyclones were named using the Joint Army/Navy Phonetic Alphabet, the first of which formed on August 18. The final storm of the season dissipated on October 28, two and a half weeks before the season officially ended on November 15.

Four of the tropical cyclones made landfall during the season, the first being the February tropical storm that crossed southern Florida. It moved up most of the East Coast of the United States, leaving 3 deaths and widespread damage. As a developing tropical cyclone, Hurricane Charlie caused damaging flooding and landslides in southwest Puerto Rico.

Timeline

Systems

Tropical Storm One 

On February 2, a non-frontal low formed in the western Caribbean Sea two months after the end of the hurricane season. It moved quickly north-northwestward and acquired gale-force winds as it brushed the northern coast of Cuba. Early on February 3, the storm struck Cape Sable, Florida and quickly crossed the state. The Miami National Weather Service office recorded a wind gust of  during its passage. The winds damaged windows and power lines, catching residents and tourists off-guard. The cyclone also dropped  of precipitation along its path, causing crop damage in Miami-Dade County.

After leaving Florida, the storm briefly transitioned into a tropical storm on February 3, the only tropical or subtropical storm on record in the month. On February 4 it evolved into an extratropical cyclone off the coast of North Carolina. Later that day, it passed over Cape Cod, and early on February 5 dissipated after crossing into Maine. The storm caused scattered power outages and gusty winds across New England.

Hurricane Able 

Over six months after the previous storm dissipated, a tropical depression developed just off the west coast of Africa on August 18. It moved generally west- to west-northwestward for much of its duration, intensifying into a tropical storm on August 24 east of the Lesser Antilles. The next day, Hurricane Hunters confirmed the presence of Tropical Storm Able. Passing north of the islands, the storm attained hurricane status on August 27. The town was heavily damaged, and was briefly isolated after winds downed power and telephone lines. Across South Carolina, the hurricane caused two indirect deaths, as well as moderate damage totaling $2.2 million (1952 USD, $  USD).

As Able turned north and northeastward over land, the winds quickly weakened to tropical storm force, although it retained gale-force winds through North Carolina, Virginia, and Maryland; this was due to remaining over the flat terrain east of the Appalachian Mountains, as well as retaining a plume of tropical moisture from its south. It left light damage in North Carolina, some of it due to a tornado. In Maryland, heavy rainfall caused widespread flooding, which washed out the tracks of the Baltimore and Ohio Railroad near Baltimore. In Ellicott City, Maryland, the rains flooded several houses, forcing families to evacuate. Two tornadoes were also reported in the region, and damage in the Washington, D.C. area reached $500,000 (1952 USD, $  USD). Further northeast, the storm continued to produce heavy rainfall, causing flooding, as well as one indirect death in Pennsylvania. After moving through New England, Able dissipated on September 2 near Portland, Maine.

Tropical Storm Three 

A cold front was located north of the Bahamas on August 26, with a broad area of cyclonic turning located east of northern Florida. Atmospheric pressures were falling in the region, and gale-force winds were recorded by 12:00 UTC on August 27. Based on the structure, it is estimated that the frontal low developed into a tropical storm by 18:00 UTC that day. The storm continued to the northwest, making landfall very near Myrtle Beach, South Carolina at 02:00 UTC on August 28. The storm weakened over land and dissipated late on August 28 over eastern Kentucky.

Hurricane Baker 

The third tropical cyclone of the season developed on August 31 a short distance east of the northern Lesser Antilles. Its presence was reported by a ship the next day that encountered rough seas and gale-force winds. As a result, the Weather Bureau sent the Hurricane Hunters to investigate the system, which reported a strengthening hurricane moving northwestward. Given the name Baker, the hurricane passed north of the Lesser Antilles, reaching peak winds of  late on September 3.

With a large anticyclone located over the Ohio Valley, Baker turned to the northeast on September 5, passing about halfway between Bermuda and North Carolina. Wind gusts on Avalon Peninsula reached , and heavy fishing damage was reported in Lower Island Cove. After affecting the island, Baker transitioned into an extratropical storm, which lasted another day before dissipating south of Greenland.

Tropical Storm Five 

A dissipating cold front stalled across the northeastern Atlantic Ocean on September 7, northeast of the Azores. That day, a closed circulation developed and quickly became independent of the front. Based on a uniform thermal structure, as well as ship reports in the region of gale-force winds near the center, it is estimated that the system became a tropical storm early on September 8. Forming at a latitude of 42.0°N, this system is notable for being the northernmost forming tropical cyclone in the Atlantic hurricane database, dating back to 1851.

The system moved west-southwestward, atypical for cyclones in that region during September. Moving slowly through the northern Azores, the storm produced winds of  along Terceira Island. It slowly weakened, and by late on September 10 the system degraded into a tropical depression. By the next day, the system was interacting with an approaching cold front, indicating that the depression had transitioned into an extratropical cyclone. Around 20:00 UTC, the storm moved ashore the southwestern tip of Portugal with gale-force winds. The storm turned to the northeast through the Iberian Peninsula, dissipating on September 14 over southwestern France.

Hurricane Charlie 

On September 22, a tropical wave moved into the eastern Caribbean Sea, spawning a tropical depression near Hispaniola early on September 24. In Puerto Rico, the rains caused landslides that affected seven towns, notably Ponce, the island's second-largest city. There, at least 14 buildings were destroyed. The floods left more than 1,000 people homeless, 300 of whom took refuge in a Red Cross shelter. Overall, the flooding on the island killed four people and left moderate damage of around $1 million (1952 USD, $  USD).

After affecting Puerto Rico, the low continued to organize, and subsequently struck the Dominican Republic on September 23. The circulation became disrupted while crossing Hispaniola, although it reorganized near the Turks and Caicos Islands and became Tropical Storm Charlie before reaching those islands. On September 25, Charlie attained hurricane status,, and due to its continued northwest motion, the Weather Bureau advised small craft to remain at port in the southeastern United States coast. It briefly threatened Bermuda, prompting the United States Air Force to evacuate its fleet of airplanes from Kindley Air Force Base. Charlie ultimately northwest of Bermuda, and later began weakening. On September 29 it turned eastward, and later that day transitioned into an extratropical cyclone.

Tropical Storm Dog 

On September 18, a tropical wave exited the west coast of Africa, which spawned a tropical cyclone east of the Lesser Antilles on September 24. The system quickly intensified and was given the name Dog. The storm moved northwestward for its entire duration. Dog began weakening on September 27, and over the next few days the circulation lost its definition. On September 29, Dog weakened to a tropical depression, and dissipated the next day. The Weather Bureau advised ships to avoid the storm, but overall Dog did not affect land.

Tropical Storm Eight 

On September 24, a tropical wave moved off the west coast of Africa. It is estimated that a closed circulation developed on the next day, suggesting the formation of a tropical depression. It turned to the north on September 27 and likely weakened, although observations were sparse. By September 30, the system lost its circulation and degenerated into an open trough.

Hurricane Easy 

The depression proceeded northward, and was detected by the Hurricane Hunters on October 7 as a strengthening tropical storm. On that basis, the storm was named Easy. By that time, the hurricane had turned sharply to the east, and later began to move toward the south. As quickly as it strengthened, Easy began to weaken, and an aircraft reported winds of only  on October 9. Easy never affected land.

Hurricane Fox 

The strongest tropical cyclone of the season formed on October 20 in the Caribbean Sea off the northwest coast of Colombia, believed to have been from the Intertropical Convergence Zone. It moved northwestward, intensifying into a tropical storm on October 21 and a hurricane the following day. Fox subsequently turned to the north, intensifying to a major hurricane as it passed west of the Cayman Islands. Late on October 24, the cyclone struck the small island of Cayo Guano del Estes in the Archipelago de los Canarreos, south of Cienfuegos, Cuba. Shortly thereafter, Fox crossed the mainland coast of Cuba west of Cienfuegos, and it weakened while crossing the island.

Hurricane Fox crossed Cuba in a rural area dominated by sugar plantations, with heavy damage reported to 36 mills. In one town, the hurricane destroyed about 600 homes and damaged over 1,000 more. Across the island, the strongest winds downed large trees and washed a large freighter ashore. Heavy rainfall affected all but the extreme eastern and western end of the island, with a peak of  near Havana. The rains flooded low-lying areas and caused rivers to exceed their banks. Throughout Cuba, Hurricane Fox killed 600 people, and left behind heavy damage totaling $10 million (1952 USD, $  USD). Fox was among the strongest hurricanes to strike the country.

On New Providence, the hurricane dropped  of rainfall, Strong winds caused severe crop damage, leaving 30% of the tomato crop destroyed. After briefly restrengthening to a major hurricane, Fox began a steady weakening trend. It turned abruptly to the north-northwest, followed by another turn to the northeast. On October 28, Fox was absorbed by a cold front west-southwest of Bermuda.

Tropical Storm Eleven 

A cold front stalled north of the Virgin Islands on November 23, spawning an extratropical storm the next day. The system strengthened while moving northward, attaining gale-force winds on November 25. The observation, within a warm environment and in concurrence with gale-force winds, suggested that the system became a tropical storm on November 26, although the system likely was a subtropical cyclone due to the structure. Another front in the region steered the storm to the south and east in a counterclockwise circle. Weakening slightly, the system briefly transitioned into an extratropical storm on November 30 before dissipating later that day within the front.

Storm names 
These names were used to name storms during the 1952 season, the third and final time storm names were taken from the Joint Army/Navy Phonetic Alphabet.

See also 

 List of Atlantic hurricanes
 Atlantic hurricane season
 Australian region cyclone seasons: 1951–52 1952–53
 South Pacific cyclone seasons: 1951–52 1952–53
 South-West Indian Ocean cyclone seasons: 1951–52 1952–53

References

External links 
 Monthly Weather Review

 
Articles which contain graphical timelines